Arthur Lewis Horner (5 April 1894 – 4 September 1968) was a Welsh trade union leader and communist politician. During his periods of office as President of the South Wales Miners Federation (SWMF) from 1936, and as General Secretary of the National Union of Mineworkers (NUM) from 1946, he became one of the most prominent and influential communists in British public life.

Early career
Arthur Horner was born in Merthyr Tydfil, South Wales, the eldest surviving son of a family of seventeen children only six of whom lived past infancy.  Horner's father was a chargehand porter in the railway goods station. His maternal grandfather and two maternal uncles were miners. His earliest employment was as a grocer's assistant and delivery boy in the coalfield communities around Merthyr. After a short spell in Merthyr railway goods station he was drawn into coalmining employment in 1915 due to his growing interest in the political radicalism of trade union activists in the nearby Rhondda coalfield.

Early political allegiances
Horner's first political affiliation was socialist and Keir Hardie, who had been elected MP for Merthyr Tydfil in 1900, was his first political hero. After he had joined the Independent Labour Party in Merthyr, Horner moved to the colliery village of Ynyshir in the Rhondda where he became a protégé of Noah Ablett, trade union militant, executive member of the South Wales Miners Federation and also convenor of local classes in Marxist education which Horner attended. During this period Horner gradually relinquished the strong Christian faith of his teenage years during which he had been baptised into the Churches of Christ. This small but intellectually inclined Protestant sect, had recognised his potential talent as a preacher and financed a period of training for him as a lay evangelist from which he gained considerable confidence in public speaking and debate.

Opposing the First World War from the standpoint of class solidarity, in 1917 he fled to Dublin to avoid arrest for ignoring his call-up papers. Horner was a supporter of demands for Irish Home Rule and became involved with the rebel factions from the 1916 Easter Rising, joining the Irish Citizen Army. Horner said that he chose Ireland because he believed the "Irish are the only people waging a war of real freedom" On his return to Britain he was arrested by the police and handed over to the army. For disobeying orders he was sentenced to six months hard labour at Wormwood Scrubs. After he had served his sentence he was refused the amnesty made available after the war to most conscientious objectors, rearrested and sent to Carmarthen jail. The SWMF campaigned for his release and to this end secured his election in absentia as checkweighman at Mardy Colliery, one of the most militant collieries in the Rhondda valleys.  To add to the pressure on the authorities Horner began a hunger strike, refusing both food and water. After six days this combination of tactics secured his release in May 1919.

Member of the Communist Party of Great Britain and Trade Union leader
Horner became a founding member of the Communist Party of Great Britain (CPGB) in 1921. He was part of the nucleus of Communists who founded the National Minority Movement in August 1924. Elected to the Executive Committee of the SWMF in 1926, he played a leading role in the ten-month-long countrywide lockout of coalminers in 1926, following the General Strike.

During the early years of the 1930s Horner's disaffection with the CPGB's policy towards trade unions was such that he faced expulsion from the party. "Hornerism" was denounced by the CPGB Executive as a deviation from the Comintern's (Communist International) Third Period or "Class Against Class" line. Horner travelled to Moscow in 1931 to appeal against his proposed expulsion before a Comintern commission. The verdict, which identified mistakes on both sides, was sufficiently equitable for Horner to feel he could comply with the required public admission of his alleged mistakes.

In 1932, imprisoned on trumped-up charges of unlawful assembly, Horner took the opportunity availed to him as Cardiff prison librarian to study The Art of War by Carl von Clausewitz, a work which would significantly influence his future approach to formulating Union strategy and class politics in general – often leading to further conflict with the CPGB Executive. His increased strategic awareness would leave him strongly inclined against indiscriminate outbreaks of industrial action jeopardising the Union's strength and ability to win concessions for its members.

Having stood unsuccessfully as a CPGB Parliamentary candidate in the 1933 Rhondda East by-election, Horner was elected President of the South Wales Miners' Federation in 1936. He served until 1946 and was instrumental in effecting a series of compromise settlements with the coal owners that rationalized industrial relations and improved wages and conditions.

During the Second World War, from his position on the Executive of the Miners' Federation of Great Britain, Horner exploited to the full the union's enhanced bargaining position, securing significant improvements in miner's wages and conditions. He played a key role in regulating relations between the wartime government, the coal owners, and the unions. His force of character and intellectual abilities were recognised by civil servants and ministers in the wartime coalition government, who used his enthusiasm and tactical finesse to great advantage to maximise coal production.
 
In August 1946, Horner was elected General Secretary of the unified National Union of Mineworkers (NUM) into which the coalfield unions had merged. Horner's reputation was such that he was in a commanding position to direct the union's strategy on the nationalisation of the industry and thereafter during the period of post-war reconstruction. This strategy linked a commitment to increased productivity to a series of demands set out in the 1946 Miners' Charter. These included:  a five-day working week without loss of pay; a guaranteed weekly wage average wage not to fall below that of any other sector of British industry; two weeks paid holiday; adequate pensions at the age of fifty five; modernisation at existing pits together with the sinking of new ones; adequate training for young people; new safety laws; proper compensation payments for industrial injury and disease; the construction of new towns and villages with good housing in mining areas.

The early agreement in principle to the terms of the Charter by the newly elected Labour government reflected its urgent desire to have the NUM's full support for the newly nationalised industry. It was also an acknowledgement that Horner's expertise and influence was indispensable to delivering much needed increases in coal production. Nationalisation took effect from 1 January 1947 and The National Agreement of the same year delivered the five-day working week. By 1955 all 12 points of the Charter had been implemented.

By the time he retired from office in 1959, the NUM had secured on behalf of its membership some of the best terms and conditions of employment of any sector of British industry.

In 1959 he was made a Freeman of the County Borough of Merthyr Tydfil.

Horner died in 1968 at the age of 74. He was cremated at Golders Green Crematorium.

References

Bibliography
 R. Page Arnot, (1961) The Miners in Crisis and War.  London: Allen and Unwin.
 Nina Fishman, (1996) "Heroes and anti-heroes: communists in the coalfields" in Campbell, Alan, Fishman, Nina, and Howell, David (eds).  Miners, Unions and Politics 1910–1947. Aldershot: Scolar Press.
 Nina Fishman, (2001) "Horner and Hornerism"  in McIlroy, J, Morgan, K, Campbell, A (eds).  Party People, Communist Lives. London: Lawrence and Wishart.
 Nina Fishman, (2010) Arthur Horner: A Political Biography. Volume 1 1894–1944, Volume 2 1944–1968. London: Lawrence & Wishart.
 Arthur Horner, (1960) Incorrigible Rebel. London: MacGibbon and Kee.

External links
Arthur Horner Archive Marxists Internet Archive
 

1894 births
1968 deaths
Communist Party of Great Britain members
General Secretaries of the National Union of Mineworkers (Great Britain)
British trade union leaders
People from Merthyr Tydfil
Welsh communists
Welsh trade unionists
Welsh conscientious objectors
Irish Citizen Army members